Hameer Singh Bhayal is an Indian politician from the Bharatiya Janata Party and a member of the Rajasthan Legislative Assembly representing the Siwana Vidhan Sabha constituency of Rajasthan.

Political 

Hameer Singh Bhayal contested assembly elections as a Bhartiya Janta Party candidate from Siwana Assembly constituency in 2013 and won a seat for the BJP.

Similarly, in 2018 he also again won the assembly elections.

References 

Living people
Bharatiya Janata Party politicians from Rajasthan
Rajasthan MLAs 2013–2018
1958 births
Rajasthan MLAs 2018–2023